Ryūjin Onsen (龍神温泉) is an onsen (hot spring) located in Ryūjin village, now a part of Tanabe, Wakayama City in Wakayama Prefecture, Japan. Ryūjin Onsen was discovered in the 7th century by En no Gyōja, the founder of Shugendō. Kōbō Daishi, founder of Shingon Buddhism visited the spot in the 9th century. During the Edo period (1603-1868), the onsen was used as a resort area by the Tokugawa ruling family, whose castle was in Wakayama city. Today there are old Japanese inns (ryokans) using the names Kamigoten (Royal Palace) and Shimogoten (Lower Lodgings), from the old feudal system. It is said to be the third best onsen for beautifying your skin in Japan.

See also 
Kōya-Ryūjin Quasi-National Park

References 

Article contains translated text from 龍神温泉 on the Japanese Wikipedia retrieved on 17 March 2017.

External links 
Homepage in Japanese
Detailed description including maps
Profile on Japan Guide
Profile on Japan Hoppers

Hot springs of Wakayama Prefecture
Spa towns in Japan
Tourist attractions in Wakayama Prefecture